Đorđije Ćetković (Cyrillic: Ђорђије Ћетковић; born 3 January 1983) is a Montenegrin retired footballer who played as a midfielder. He played three times for the Montenegro national team.

Club career
Born in Titograd, Montenegro (now Podgorica, Montenegro), Ćetković began playing at a minor Montenegrin club, FK Crvena Stijena, from where he moved to FK Budućnost Podgorica. His good performance brought him offers from clubs, but he decided to stay in the domestic league, this time in Serbia for Belgrade's clubs FK Čukarički and FK Železnik.

In January 2006, he moved to German club F.C. Hansa Rostock. On 15 December 2008, he was released together with teammate Dexter Langen. He signed on 8 January 2009 a contract with VfL Osnabrück and was demoted to the reserve team on 14 April 2009.

In summer 2009, Ćetković returned to Budućnost Podgorica. In January 2010, he was released by Budućnost. In the same month, he joined Bnei Sakhnin from the Israeli Premier League. In summer 2010, he moved to the Hungarian side Győri ETO. In February 2012, Ćetković signed with Albanian club KS Kastrioti. In summer 2012, he signed with Thai club Buriram United. He finished the 2012–13 season playing with FK Sutjeska Nikšić in the Montenegrin First League, and in summer 2013 he returned to Serbia this time to play with second-level club FK Bežanija.

International career
Ćetković made his debut for Montenegro in a June 2007 Kirin Cup match against hosts Japan and has earned a total of 3 caps, scoring no goals. His final international was a November 2008 friendly match against Macedonia.

Personal life
Ćetković is the nephew of the famous Montenegrin footballer, Predrag Mijatović, and brother of Marko Ćetković.

Honours
Buriram United
 Thai FA Cup Champion: 2012

References

External links
 
 
 Profile and stats until 2003 at Dekisa.Tripod 

1983 births
Living people
Footballers from Podgorica
Association football midfielders
Serbia and Montenegro footballers
Montenegrin footballers
Montenegro international footballers
FK Crvena Stijena players
FK Budućnost Podgorica players
FK Čukarički players
FK Železnik players
FK Voždovac players
FC Hansa Rostock players
VfL Osnabrück players
Bnei Sakhnin F.C. players
Győri ETO FC players
FK Zeta players
KS Kastrioti players
Đorđije Cetkovic
FK Sutjeska Nikšić players
FK Bežanija players
Kahramanmaraşspor footballers
FK Kom players
FK Jedinstvo Bijelo Polje players
Second League of Serbia and Montenegro players
First League of Serbia and Montenegro players
2. Bundesliga players
Bundesliga players
Montenegrin First League players
Israeli Premier League players
Nemzeti Bajnokság I players
Kategoria Superiore players
Đorđije Cetkovic
Serbian First League players
TFF First League players
Montenegrin Second League players
Serbia and Montenegro expatriate footballers
Expatriate footballers in Germany
Serbia and Montenegro expatriate sportspeople in Germany
Montenegrin expatriate footballers
Montenegrin expatriate sportspeople in Germany
Expatriate footballers in Israel
Montenegrin expatriate sportspeople in Israel
Expatriate footballers in Hungary
Montenegrin expatriate sportspeople in Hungary
Expatriate footballers in Albania
Montenegrin expatriate sportspeople in Albania
Expatriate footballers in Thailand
Montenegrin expatriate sportspeople in Thailand
Expatriate footballers in Serbia
Montenegrin expatriate sportspeople in Serbia
Expatriate footballers in Turkey
Montenegrin expatriate sportspeople in Turkey
FK Partizan non-playing staff